Gonchen (also known as Derge Monastery) is a large Sakya Tibetan Buddhist monastery in the town of Derge, in Sichuan, China. Gonchen is located in the ethnic Tibetan cultural region of Kham.

Description
The main chapel of the monastery is an extensive complex which resulted in it being called the "great monastery". The monastery has a notable design, with striped walls of white, dark red and gray, colors unique to the Sakya sect of Tibetan Buddhism.

Below the monastery itself is the famous Derge Parkhang (Printing House), built in 1729, where the Buddhist scriptures the Kangyur and the Tengyur and other Buddhist works are still printed from wooden blocks in traditional handwork. The printing house, run by monks of the monastery, continues to use ancient techniques and uses no electricity. The roof is used for drying the printed sheets. It houses some 217,000 engraved blocks of scriptures from all Tibetan Buddhist sects including the Bon and about 2,500 pages are hand-produced each day by monks in the traditional manner. Upstairs in the same building older printers produce prints on both cloth and paper. Workers carve new wooden printing blocks in the administrative building opposite the monastery which is protected from earthquakes and fire by the goddess Drolma, an emanation of Tara.

Tangyel Lhakhang is a secondary temple to the west of Gonchen Monastery's main temple.

History
Gonchen Monastery was founded by Thang Tong Gyalpo (or Tangton Gyelpo) (1385-1464), a Buddhist yogi and polymath, physician, and treasure finder, renowned for founding of Ache Lhamo, the Tibetan opera, and the numerous iron suspension bridges he constructed throughout the Himalayan region. He is said to have made 108 of them, the most celebrated being the one over the Yarlung Tsangpo near modern Chushul. He is often shown in murals with long white hair and holding some chain links from his bridges.

The monastery was completely destroyed during the Cultural Revolution.

The monastery was restored in the 1980s and the three inner sanctums are dedicated to Guru Rinpoche (Padmasambhava), Sakyamuni Buddha (Sakya Thukpa) and the future Buddha, Jampa or Maitreya. On the way downhill to the printing press there is a small alley which leads off to the left to the Tangton Gyelpo Chapel (Tangyel Lhakhang).

Recent events
On 27 January, 2009, a protest involving several Tibetan monks near the monastery was crushed by police by gunfire and detentions, according to the Tibetan Center for Human Rights and Democracy citing reports from the region. The monks were released four days later but, according to sources cited by the Voice of Tibet, 30 had been badly injured following beatings and torture.

Gallery

References

External links
Images

Buddhist monasteries in Sichuan
Sakya monasteries and temples
Kham